José Guillermo Izquierdo Stella was a Puerto Rican politician affiliated with the Popular Democratic Party.  He served as a legislator in the Puerto Rico House of Representatives from 1973 to 1976.  Afterwards he was a senator in the Senate of Puerto Rico from 1985 to 1992.

Obtained his degree in law from the University of Puerto Rico School of Law. From 1973 to 1977 he was the president of the Consumer Affairs Commission of the Puerto Rico House of Representatives. As a legislator he was instrumental in the creation of the Puerto Rico Department of Consumer Affairs and of the Government Ethics law of Puerto Rico. He died on September 12, 2010, and was laid in state in Capitol of Puerto Rico. He was a member of Phi Sigma Alpha fraternity.

References

Members of the Senate of Puerto Rico
People from Guayanilla, Puerto Rico
Popular Democratic Party members of the House of Representatives of Puerto Rico
Puerto Rican businesspeople
University of Puerto Rico alumni
1936 births
2010 deaths